is a Japanese light novel author. He is best known as the creator of Sword Art Online and Accel World, both of which have been adapted into anime. He has also written The Isolator.

Career 
Kawahara wrote the first volume of Sword Art Online in 2001 as a competition entry for the 2002 ASCII Media Works , but refrained from submitting it as he had exceeded the page limit; he instead published it as a web novel under the pen name . Over time, he added three further main arcs and several short stories, which like the first arc Aincrad, were later adapted into the light novels.

Kawahara entered the first Accel World novel into ASCII Media Works' 15th Dengeki Novel Prize in 2008 and the novel won the Grand Prize. The first novel was published by ASCII Media Works on February 10, 2009 under their Dengeki Bunko imprint. As of March 10, 2022, 26 volumes have been published. An anime series debuted in April 2012. After gaining fame from the Dengeki award, Kawahara republished Sword Art Online in print. 26 volumes have been published as of June 2022, as well as eight volumes of Sword Art Online: Progressive. An anime series premiered in July 2012, and was followed by a for-TV movie Sword Art Online Extra Edition on December 31, 2013 a second anime series, Sword Art Online II, in July 2014, a theatrical film adaptation, Sword Art Online The Movie: Ordinal Scale, in February 2017, and the first of two seasons for the third anime series, Sword Art Online: Alicization, in October 2018. Sword Art Online: Progressive was given an anime film adaptation in the form of Sword Art Online Progressive: Aria of a Starless Night, released in Japan on October 30, 2021. A second Progressive film was released in October 2022.

The Isolator was serialized online starting in 2004,  and began publishing in print in June 2014. Five light novels and four manga have been written.

In 2022, Kawahara started publishing a new light novel series, titled Demons' Crest, with illustrations by Yukiko Horiguchi.

Inspirations 
Reki Kawahara has many inspirations growing up, from reading manga to online games. Reki Kawahara also stated in a Q&A session between the author Reki Kawahara and Heathcliff (Kayaba Akihiko) in 2005. "If I were to ask for you to mention one of the games you like best, which would it be?", Reki Kawahara stated the following  "If you mean aside from SAO, it would be Wizardry, a game from long ago. I acquired a lot of inspiration from it". Rank Anime also wrote a story on what inspired him to write Sword Art Online.

Works

Light novels 
Accel World (2009)
Sword Art Online (2009)
Sword Art Online: Progressive (2012)
The Isolator (2014)
Sword Art Online Alternative Gun Gale Online (2014) - Supervision
Demons' Crest (2022)

Film 
Accel World: Infinite Burst (2016) - Screenplay
Sword Art Online The Movie: Ordinal Scale (2017) - Screenplay
Sword Art Online Progressive: Aria of a Starless Night (2021) - Script, screenplay assistance
Sword Art Online Progressive: Scherzo of a Dark Dusk (2022) - Script, screenplay assistance

References

External links
Interviews
2013 interview from Anime News Network
2014 The Accel World Interviews Part I from Anime News Network

General
 
"Word Gear", his official blog 

The Inspiration Behind Sword Art Online (2020) - Rank Anime

1974 births
Japanese writers
Light novelists
Living people
People from Gunma Prefecture
Writers from Gunma Prefecture
Cyberpunk writers